Andrew Wilkie may  refer to:

 Andrew Wilkie (politician) (born 1961), Australian soldier, intelligence officer, environmental activist and former independent politician
 Andrew Wilkie (geneticist) (born 1953), English clinical professor of pathology
 Andrew Wilkie (zoo director) (1853–1948), director of the Melbourne Zoo